Atchison Township is an inactive township in Clinton County, in the U.S. state of Missouri.

Atchison Township has the name of David Rice Atchison, a Missouri senator.

References

Townships in Missouri
Townships in Clinton County, Missouri